Lakewood is a historic mansion in St. Joseph, Louisiana, U.S.. It was built in 1854. It has been listed on the National Register of Historic Places since March 24, 1983.

References

Houses on the National Register of Historic Places in Louisiana
Greek Revival architecture in Louisiana
Houses completed in 1854
Buildings and structures in Tensas Parish, Louisiana